Selborne Hill is one of the highest points in the county of Hampshire, England. Its prominence of 53 metres qualifies it as one of the county's Tumps.

Selborne Hill lies above the village of Selborne on the edge of the Hampshire Downs, its crown playing host to Selborne Common, an area of woodland and relict wood-pasture. Its summit and steep escarpment are covered by woods, with Selborne Hanger to the northeast dropping abruptly to the fields above Selborne. The Zig-Zag Path runs down the spur towards the east. This is the area where the world famous naturalist and pioneer of birdwatching, Rev. Gilbert White, wrote his celebrated Natural History of Selborne.

References 

Hills of Hampshire